Radúz Činčera (17 June 1923, Brno – 28 January 1999, Prague) was a Czech screenwriter and director, the conceiver of the legendary Kinoautomat.

Career 
Most of his life he worked in the Krátký film Praha (The Short Film of Prague) movie studio where he was author and director of a series of short documentary films.  
Nevertheless, his most famous work is the Kinoautomat, the world's first interactive movie, for the Czechoslovak Pavilion at Expo '67 in Montreal.

Another big project of Radúz Činčera was The Sound Game Show at the Man and His World exhibition in Montreal in 1971. He also astonished the global audience with his audio-visual projects in Kobe, Japan and in Vancouver, British Columbia.  
In the second half of the 1980s his multimedia music inscenation of the rock opera The Scroll was extremely successful in Canada.

Like some other Czech artists, Radúz Činčera's artistic and public work was restricted after the Soviet takeover of Czechoslovakia in 1968.

Filmography

References

External links
 

1923 births
1999 deaths
Czech film directors
Film people from Brno